Mizar: The Star of Hope is Macedonian 2014 documentary film written and directed by Marko Dzambazoski. It is the first documentary film for one of the most successful Macedonian bands, Mizar.

Plot
The film tells the story of the beginnings of the legendary Macedonian band "Mizar", the tough path in which from ordinary garage band, Mizar becomes one of the most important bands in the history of the Macedonian rock culture.

Release
The film's world premiere took place on 27 August 2014, on the Skopje Film Festival. After that, the film was shown at many festivals in the Balkans including DORF (Croatia), MakeDox (Macedonia), Starigrad Paklenica Film Festival (Croatia), KRAF (Serbia), Gitarijada (Serbia), and, beyond the Balkan's borders, (Greece).

References

External links
 
 http://telma.mk/vesti/dokumentaren-film-za-mizar-od-marko-dzhambazoski

Macedonian documentary films